Theron Judson Fouts Sr. (July 5, 1893 – April 28, 1954) was an American football player, coach, and college athletics administrator.  He served as head football coach at North Texas State Normal College—renamed as North Texas State Teachers' College in 1923, and now known as the University of North Texas—from 1920 to 1924. Fouts amassed a 23–14–2 record. He also started the school's track and field program and initiated the drive to build the 20,000-seat Eagle Stadium on campus. The venue was named Fouts Field in his honor.

Born in Gonzales, Texas, Fouts was a football player at Baylor University, where he lettered for four years (1914–1917).  He died of a heart attack on April 28, 1954 in Denton, Texas.  Fouts was married to Leslie Vann Sams Fouts and had two daughters and a son: Mary Lee Fouts (born October 20, 1920 in Crockett, TX), Dorthy Nell Fouts Crockett (born November 7, 1924 in Denton), and Theron Judson Fouts Jr. (born March 3, 1926 in Denton).

Head coaching record

Football

References

1893 births
1954 deaths
Basketball coaches from Texas
Baylor Bears football players
North Texas Mean Green athletic directors
North Texas Mean Green baseball coaches
North Texas Mean Green football coaches
North Texas Mean Green men's basketball coaches
North Texas Mean Green track and field coaches
University of North Texas faculty
People from Gonzales, Texas